Ideonella sakaiensis is a bacterium from the genus Ideonella and family Comamonadaceae capable of breaking down and consuming the plastic polyethylene terephthalate (PET) using it as both a carbon and energy source. The bacterium was originally isolated from a sediment sample taken outside of a plastic bottle recycling facility in Sakai City, Japan.

Discovery
Ideonella sakaiensis was first identified in 2016 by a team of researchers led by Kohei Oda of Kyoto Institute of Technology and Kenji Miyamoto of Keio University after collecting a sample of PET-contaminated sediment at a plastic bottle recycling facility in Sakai, Japan. The bacteria was first isolated from a consortium of microorganisms in the sediment sample, which included protozoa and yeast-like cells. The entire microbial community was shown to mineralize 75% of the degraded PET into carbon dioxide once it had been initially degraded and assimilated by Ideonella sakaiensis.

Characterization

Physical Attributes

Ideonella sakaiensis is gram-negative, aerobic, and rod-shaped. Cells are motile and have a single flagellum. Colonies of I. sakaiensis are colorless, smooth, and circular. Its size varies from 0.6 to 0.8 μm in width and 1.2-1.5 μm in length.

Chemical Attributes

I. sakaiensis also tests positive for oxidase and catalase. The bacterium grows at a pH range of 5.5 to 9.0 (optimally at 7 to 7.5) and a temperature of 15–42°C (optimally at 30–37°C).

Use of Characteristics

The gram negativity in bacteria makes it so they have resistant abilities and genes; this could include antibiotic resistance. The gram negativity as a characteristic also signifies this bacteria has a thin cell wall and has a high lipid content. 

The aerobic aspect of this bacteria makes it so that it can only grow and thrive in an environment that contains the presence of oxygen within their vicinity. Ideonella sakaiensis and other aerobic bacterium are therefore known to survive in oxygen-rich soil that is moist and aerated. 

The flagellum attached to this bacteria are used as motile organelles and are able to rotate and thrust the cell throughout its environment by creating motion. The bacterium was also shown to grow on Polyethylene terephthalate (PET) surface which is a type of plastic. The bacteria was able to adhere to the PET plastic with its thin flagellum. This is shown in the image to the right. These flagellum may also function to secrete PET-degrading enzymes onto the PET surface known as PETase. 

Through phylogenetic analysis, the species was shown to be a part of the genus Ideonella, but possessed a significantly different genome than other known species in the genus, including Ideonella dechloratans and Ideonella azotifigens, thus justifying its classification as a new species.

Degradation and assimilation of PET

Ideonella sakaiensis adhere to PET surface and use a secreted PET hydrolase, or PETase, to degrade the PET into mono(2-hydroxyethyl)terephthalic acid (MHET), a heterodimer composed of terephthalic acid (TPA) and ethylene glycol. The PETase also degrades PET into another intermediate known as Bis-(2-hydroxyethyl) terephthalate (BHET), BHET can be converted into MHET after PET hydrolysis. The I. sakaiensis PETase functions by hydrolyzing the ester bonds present in PET with high specificity. The resulting MHET is then degraded into its two monomeric constituents by a lipid-anchored MHET hydrolase enzyme, or MHETase, on the cell's outer membrane. The overall mechanism of the PET plastic being broken down is exhibited in the image to the right. The monomeric constituents such as ethylene glycol is then taken up and used by I. sakaiensis and many other bacteria. The other constituent; terephthalic acid, a more recalcitrant compound, is imported into the I. sakaiensis cell via the terephthalic acid transporter protein. Once in the cell, the aromatic terephthalic acid molecule is oxidized by terephthalic acid-1,2-dioxygenase and 1,2-dihydroxy-3,5-cyclohexadiene-1,4-dicarboxylate dehydrogenase into a catechol intermediate. The catechol ring is then cleaved by PCA 3,4-dioxygenase before the compound is integrated into other metabolic pathways (e.g. TCA cycle). As a result, both of the molecules derived from the PET are used by the cell to produce energy and to build necessary biomolecules. Eventually, the assimilated carbon may be mineralized to carbon dioxide and released into the atmosphere.

Impact and applications
The discovery of Ideonella sakaiensis has potential importance for the degradation of PET plastics. Prior to its discovery, the only known degraders of PET were a small number of bacteria and fungi, including Fusarium solani, and no organisms were definitively known to degrade PET as a primary carbon and energy source. The discovery of I. sakaiensis spurred discussion about PET biodegradation as a method of recycling and bioremediation.

The wild-type bacterium is able to colonize and break down a thin (0.2 mm thickness) film of low-crystallinity (soft) PET in approximately 6 weeks, and the responsible PETase enzyme was shown to degrade high-crystallinity (hard) PET approximately 30-fold slower (180 weeks or more than 3 years) than low-crystallinity PET. A large amount of manufactured PET is highly crystalline (e.g. plastic bottles), so it is thought that any prospective applications of the I. sakaiensis PETase enzyme in recycling programs will need to be preceded by genetic optimization of the enzyme. The MHETase enzyme could also be optimized and used in recycling or bioremediation applications in combination with the PETase enzyme. It degrades the MHET produced by the PETase into ethylene glycol and terephthalic acid. Once formed, these two compounds can be further biodegraded into carbon dioxide by I. sakaiensis or other microbes, or they can be purified and used to manufacture new PET in an industrial recycling plant setting.

Ideonella sakaiensis is being studied for this PET degrading capabilities as a means of water management issues of sewage fed fisheries. Various strains of this bacterium has been shown to not pose any threats to the growth and cultivation of fish. This species of bacteria are able to properly use PET as a source of carbon and thrive in wastewater and plastic polluted water ecosystems, showing its promise as a cost-effective anti-pollutant.

Genetic engineering
The PET plastic degrading enzyme of Ideonella sakaiensis known as; PETase, has been genetically modified and combined with MHETase to break down PET faster, which also degrades PEF (polyethylene furanoate) plastics. This along with other approaches may be useful in various efforts such as; recycling and upcycling of mixed plastics.

Coagulation Filtration System 
In 2021, fifth graders Julia Stewart and Jacob Park created the concept of a Coagulation Filtration System for Toshiba's ExploraVision contest, which utilizes Ideonella sakaiensis in a process that filters, coagulates, flocculates, and sediments water in a more environmentally friendly and efficient way. This project won the 4-6 division of ExploraVision nationally.

See also 
Organisms breaking down plastic
PET bottle recycling
PETase, the enzyme produced by this bacterium.
Pestalotiopsis microspora, an endophytic fungus species capable of breaking down polyurethane.

References

External links 
Type strain of Ideonella sakaiensis at BacDive -  the Bacterial Diversity Metadatabase

Comamonadaceae
Bacteria described in 2016
Organisms breaking down plastic